Syunya Mori is a former Grand Prix motorcycle racer from Japan. He currently races in the MFJ All Japan J-GP3 Championship aboard a Kawasaki Ninja 250, and has previous competed in the MFJ All Japan Road Race GP125 Championship, the Asia Dream Cup and the Spanish 125GP Championship.

Career statistics

By season

Races by year

References

External links
 Profile on motogp.com

Japanese motorcycle racers
Living people
Year of birth missing (living people)